Historia de crímenes is a 1942 Argentine film directed by Manuel Romero.

Cast

External links
 

1942 films
1940s Spanish-language films
Argentine black-and-white films
1940s thriller films
Films directed by Manuel Romero
Argentine thriller films
1940s Argentine films